Lille Rolighed is a late 18th-century, thatched  house situated on the street that leads up to Fredensborg Palace in Fredensborg, Denmark. The garden features the grave of  embroidery artist Cathrine Marie Møller. The house from 1777 (extended in 1820), an outhouse from 1840  and Møller's tomb were listed in the Danish registry of protected buildings and places in 1964,

History
Fredensborg Palace was completed in 1722. Many of the first houses along Slotsgade were built by craftsmen associated with the castle. Lille Rolighed was built in 1777 by tailor Christian Tøyberg in the southern end of the street.

Lille Rolighed was later the home of embroidery artist Cathrine Marie Møller (1744–1811). In 1790, she became the second woman inducted into the Royal Danish Academy of Fine Arts.

The house was later acquired by a grocer named Steen, who in 1820 opened a grocery shop in an extension. The shop had by the end of the century been converted into a laundry business.

Architecture

The original design followed the Neoclassical ideal, but this was lost in 1820 when the house was expanded by four bays on its north side.

References

External links

Listed buildings and structures in Fredensborg Municipality
Houses in Fredensborg Municipality
Thatched buildings in Denmark
Houses completed in 1777
1888 establishments in Denmark